Islam in Georgia was introduced in 654 when an army sent by the Third Caliph of Islam, Uthman, conquered Eastern Georgia and established Muslim rule in Tbilisi.  Currently, Muslims constitute approximately 9.9% of the Georgian population. According to other sources, Muslims constitute 10-11% of Georgia's population.

In July 2011, Parliament of Georgia passed new law allowing religious minority groups with "historic ties to Georgia" to register. The draft of the law specifically mentions Islam and four other religious communities.

Mosques in Georgia operate under the supervision of the Georgian Muslim Department, established in May 2011. Until then the affairs of Georgia's Muslims had been governed from abroad by the Baku-based Caucasus Muslims Department.

In 2010, Turkey and Georgia signed an agreement by which Turkey will provide funding and expertise to rehabilitate three mosques and to rebuild a fourth one in 
Georgia, while Georgia will rehabilitate four Georgian monasteries in Turkey. The Georgia-Turkey agreement will allow the reconstruction of the historical Azize mosque in Batumi, Ajaria demolished in the middle of the last century. Turkey will rehabilitate the mosques at Samtskhe-Javakheti and Akhaltsikhe regions, Kobuleti District, build the Azize mosque burned down in 1940 and restore the Turkish bathhouse in Batumi.

History

Emirate of Tbilisi

The Arabs first appeared in Georgia in 645. It was not, however, until 735, when they succeeded in establishing their firm control over a large portion of the country. In that year, Marwan II took hold of Tbilisi and much of the neighbouring lands and installed there an Arab emir, who was to be confirmed by the Caliph of Baghdad or, occasionally, by the ostikan of Armīniya.

During the Arab period, Tbilisi (al-Tefelis) grew into a center of trade between the Islamic world and Europe in the north. Beyond that, it functioned as a key Arab outpost and a buffer province facing the Byzantine and Khazar dominions. Over time, Tbilisi became largely Muslim.

Timurids

Between 1386 and 1404, Georgia was subjected to invasions by the armies of Turco-Mongol conqueror Timur, whose vast empire stretched, at its greatest extent, from Central Asia into Anatolia. In the first of at least seven invasions, Timur sacked Georgia's capital, Tbilisi, and captured the king Bagrat V in 1386. In late 1401, Timur invaded the Caucasus once again. The King of Georgia had to sue for peace, and sent his brother with the contributions. Timur was preparing for a major confrontation with the Ottoman dynasty and apparently wished to freeze the currently prevailing situation in Georgia, until he could return to deal with it more decisively and thoroughly at his leisure. Thus, he made peace with George on condition that the king of Georgia supply him with troops.

Ottoman Empire and Iranian Period

The Safavid dynasty was in constant conflict with the Ottomans over full control and influence in the Caucasus. From the early 16th to the course of the second half of the 18th century, the Safavids had to deal with several independent kingdoms and principalities, as Georgia was not a single state at the time. These entities often followed divergent political courses. Safavid interests were largely directed at Eastern (the kingdoms of Kartli and Kakheti) and Southern (the kingdoms of Samtskhe-Saatabago) Georgia while Western Georgia came under Ottoman influence. These independent kingdoms became vassals of Persia as early as in 1503.

On May 29, 1555, the Safavids and the Ottoman Empire concluded a treaty at Amasya following the Ottoman–Safavid War (1532–55) by which the Caucasus was divided between the two. Western Georgia and the western part of southern Georgia fell to The Ottomans, while Eastern Georgia (comprising the kingdoms of Kartli and Kakheti) and the (largest) eastern part of southern Georgia fell to Safavid Iran. The bulk of Georgia and the region which had historically always been the most dominant stayed therefore in the Iranian sphere. This partition of the Caucasus and therefore including Georgia under Islamic rule was again confirmed in 1639.

In 1703, Vakhtang VI became the ruler of the kingdom of Kartli. In 1716, he adopted Islam and the Safavid ruler confirmed him as King of Kartli. However, at a decisive moment Vakhtang was ordered to discontinue military campaigns, leading Vakhtang to adopt a pro-Russian orientation, though the Russian failed to tender him the promised military aid.

For several centuries, the Georgian kings and aristocrats converted to Islam and served as courtiers to the Iranian Safavid, Afsharid and Qajar dynasties, who ruled them.

Demographics
The Muslims constitute from 9.9% (463,062) to 10-11% of Georgia's population.

There are two major Muslim groups in Georgia. The ethnic Georgian Muslims are Sunni Hanafi and are concentrated in the Autonomous Republic of Adjara of Georgia bordering Turkey. The ethnic Azerbaijani Muslims are predominantly Shia Ithna Ashariyah and are concentrated along the border with Azerbaijan and Armenia. The Chechens of Georgia living in Pankisi Gorge are also Sunni, but are largely Sufis of the Naqshbandi order.

The Meskhetian Turks, also a Sunni Hanafi group, are the former inhabitants of the Meskheti region of Georgia, along the border with Turkey. They were deported to Central Asia during November 15–25, 1944 by Joseph Stalin and settled within Kazakhstan, Kyrgyzstan, and Uzbekistan.  Of the 120,000 forcibly deported in cattle-trucks a total of 10,000 perished. Today they are dispersed over a number of other countries of the former Soviet Union. There are 500,000 to 700,000 Meskhetian Turks in exile in Azerbaijan and Central Asia.

There are also smaller numbers of Muslims in Georgia belonging to other ethnic groups of the South Caucasus, such as Ossetians, Armenians, and Pontic Greeks (divided between Caucasus Greeks and Turkish speaking Urums). These are mainly descended from Ottoman-era Christian Orthodox converts to Islam. Many of Georgia's Muslims defined as 'Ottoman' following Lala Mustafa Pasha's Caucasian campaign that led to the Ottoman conquest of Georgia in the 1570s were actually of Armenian or Pontic Greek origin whose ancestors in Eastern Anatolia had adopted Islam. One prominent example of an Ottoman Muslim from Georgia of Caucasus Greek origin was Resid Mehmed Pasha, who played an important role in suppressing the 1822-33 Greek War of Independence  (see also Greek Muslims and Armenian Muslims).

Geographical distribution 
According to the 2014 Georgian Census, there were 398,677 Muslims in  Georgia, down from 433,784 Muslims according to the 2004 Georgian Census. However, the share of Muslims clearly increased from 9.9 percent in 2004 to 10.7 percent in 2014. The Muslim population lives mainly in rural areas (298,668 people, or about 75% of the total population).

Notable Georgian Muslims
 Aghsartan I of Kakheti - a king of Kakheti in eastern Georgia from 1054 until his death in 1084.
 Allahverdi Khan - Iranian Safavid general and statesman of Georgian origin who was Christian and converted to Islam.
 George XI of Kartli - a Georgian King who ruled the Kingdom of Kartli and later he became viceroy of Kandahar province.
 Kaikhosro of Kartli - a wali of Kartli for the Safavids. He was the nephew of Gurgin Khan.
 Memed Abashidze
 David XI of Kartli - a Safavid appointed king of Kartli
 Jesse of Kakheti - an Iranian Safavid appointed ruler of Kakheti who converted to Islam.
 Koca Yusuf Pasha - Grand Vizier of the Ottoman Empire who also served as the governor of Peloponnese.
 Simon II of Kartli - an Iranian Safavid appointed king of Kartli
 Yirmisekiz Mehmed Çelebi - Georgian Ottoman statesman
 Omar al-Shishani - Georgian-born ISIS commander

See also 
 Chveneburi
 Iranian Georgians
 Batumi Mosque

External links 
 Islam and Islamic Practices in Georgia

References 

 
Georgia
Georgia